Jersey City Reservoir No. 3 is a decommissioned reservoir atop Bergen Hill in the Heights of Jersey City, Hudson County, New Jersey, United States, situated on approximately   just south of Pershing Field. It was built between 1871 and 1874 as part of the city's waterworks system designed to provide potable water to the city, including Ellis Island. Its perimeter wall is in the Egyptian Revival style and pump stations are in the Romanesque Revival style. The reservoir provided drinking water until the 1980s, when it was drained and abandoned for a larger reservoir at the Boonton Gorge.  Since that time, a mini-ecosystem has taken root behind the thick, 20-foot tall stone walls: trees, wildflowers, swans, great blue heron, peregrine falcons, and at the center a 6-acre (2.4 ha) lake. This urban wildlife preserve hosts numerous animal and plant species not otherwise found in an urban environment. It was listed on the state and the federal registers of historic places in 2012. Nearby Reservoir No. 1 was located on either side of Summit Avenue and has been demolished.

The Jersey City Reservoir Preservation Alliance, started in 2002, runs the maintenance and supervision programs necessary to keep the park open to the public every Saturday from May–October. The Alliance also runs summertime programming in arts, music, and recreation to bring new and returning community members to the space. The reservoir is also available for educational visits. The Alliance received the Ted Conrad “Preservationist of the Year” Award in 2005.

Plans to make changes to the wildlife area by the city have been met with resistance from preservationists.

See also

Hackensack Water Company Complex
National Register of Historic Places listings in Hudson County, New Jersey
Jersey City Reservoir Preservation Alliance

References

External links 
 Gallery: A Day in the Life: Jersey City Reservoir #3 in Jersey City
Jersey City reservoir Alliance
THE JERSEY CITY WATER WORKS PIPELINE, 1851-1873

Reservoirs in New Jersey
Buildings and structures in Jersey City, New Jersey
Buildings and structures on the National Register of Historic Places in New Jersey
Egyptian Revival architecture in the United States
Buildings and structures completed in 1874
Romanesque Revival architecture in New Jersey
Tourist attractions in Jersey City, New Jersey
National Register of Historic Places in Hudson County, New Jersey
Bodies of water of Hudson County, New Jersey
New Jersey Register of Historic Places
Parks in Hudson County, New Jersey